Mark McNally (born 23 November 1981) is an Australian racing driver.  He made his V8 Supercar debut at the 2009 Dunlop Townsville 400.

Career
McNally, the eldest of three racing brothers, began his circuit racing career at Barbagallo Raceway in the Western Australian Formula Ford Championship racing a Spectrum 06. After peaking in 2003 as runner up in the state championship McNally moved on to the Australian Formula Ford Championship in 2005, finishing eighth in points. In 2006 McNally made his debut in the Fujitsu V8 Supercar Series with Tony D'Alberto Racing finishing the season 23rd in points and 2007 one spot higher in 22nd. For the 2008 Fujitsu V8 Supercar Series his car was run by Brad Jones Racing and in 2009 McNally made with V8 Supercar Championship debut for Kelly Racing at the 2009 Dunlop Townsville 400 replacing Dale Wood in the #16 Commodore for the rest of the 2009 season. McNally was unable to find a drive for 2010 season.

Career results

Complete Bathurst 1000 results

References

1981 births
Formula Ford drivers
Living people
Racing drivers from Perth, Western Australia
Supercars Championship drivers

Kelly Racing drivers